Viorel Ferfelea (born 26 April 1985) is a Romanian former footballer who played as a midfielder for clubs such as: Sportul Studențesc, Universitatea Craiova or ASA 2013 Târgu Mureș, among others. He played in Liga I for Sportul Studențesc, Universitatea Craiova and Târgu Mureș.

Career 

Ferfelea made his debut for Sportul Studenţesc in 2004, in a Liga I match against Dinamo București. He is one of the top-scorers of his team, scoring nine goals in Liga II's 2006–07 season and six goals in the 2007–08 season, being outmatched only by Costin Curelea.

He was widely known as being the next Gheorghe Hagi with his attacking style of play and his professionalism in the game.

Viorel Ferfelea is also a former member of Romania national under-21 football team.

Honours

Club
Universitatea Craiova
Liga II: 2013–14

CSM Târgu Mureș
Liga IV – Mureș County: 2018–19

References

External links
 
 
 

1985 births
Living people
Footballers from Bucharest
Romanian footballers
Association football midfielders
Liga I players
Liga II players
FC Sportul Studențesc București players
CS Universitatea Craiova players
ASA 2013 Târgu Mureș players
CS Sportul Snagov players